Eri-TV (acronym for Eritrean Television) is an Eritrean state-owned television network. Headquartered in the nation's capital Asmara, it broadcasts 24 hours a day. The station offers around-the-clock news bulletins, talk shows, and propaganda programs. Eri-TV has a large viewership base outside of Eritrea, which the state-run channel acknowledges and utilizes to communicate with Eritreans living abroad. The network has an estimated 1–2 million weekly viewers. Eri-TV recognizes Eritrean Minority Culture and has largely adopted an equal time share between each of the country's spoken languages. Eri-TV is governed and funded by the Eritrean Ministry of Information.

Channel

Eri-TV 1 
Eri-TV 1 broadcasts internationally via satellite along with its sister radio station, Dimtsi Hafash. Broadcasts on the channel are typically either news, music videos or dramas. It also airs both domestic and international films.

The station broadcasts mostly in Tigrinya, Arabic, Tigre and English. It also airs a few programs in Italian, Amharic and Somali

Eri-TV 2 
Eri-TV 2 is the second television channel in Eritrea. It broadcasts only for domestic viewers. it provides mostly educational content. This includes English, mathematics and science programs.

Eri-TV 3  
Eri-TV 3 is the third channel in Eritrea. It broadcasts national and international sports news.

Leadership 
Following the Eritrean War of Independence, Seyoum Tsehaye, Eritrean People's Liberation Front (EPLF) member and war journalist became the first head of Eri-TV. He was arrested in 2001 after publishing a statement in favour of democracy.

See also 
Media of Eritrea

References

External links 
 

Television channels in Eritrea
Television channels and stations established in 1993